The Cameroon national beach soccer team represents Cameroon in international beach soccer competitions and is controlled by the Cameroonian Football Federation, the governing body for football in Cameroon.

Current squad
Correct as of July 2008

Coach: Jean Pierre Bahabege Ngwe

Current Staff
Head Delegation: Jean Louis Palla

Achievements
 CAF Beach Soccer Championship: WINNERS
 2006
 Runners-up
 2008

External links
 World Cup Squad
 FIFA Profile
 BSWW Profile

National sports teams of Cameroon
Football in Cameroon
African national beach soccer teams